"Way Out of Here" is a song by British progressive rock band Porcupine Tree, and the fifth track from their ninth studio album, Fear of a Blank Planet. It is remarkable for being the only full-band composition of the record. A promo two-track single was released by Roadrunner Records intended for radio airplay. The record consists of the album version of the song and a radio edit, the same used for the promo videoclip, it comes housed in a cardboard sleeve with unique artwork.

The song contains soundscapes provided by King Crimson's guitarist, Robert Fripp.

"Way Out of Here" was written in order to replace the song "Cheating the Polygraph," which was originally intended to be in the album; however, the band decided it did not fit well the concept, so it was thrown out from the final track list. "Cheating the Polygraph" was later included on the Nil Recurring EP.

Track listing
Way Out of Here (edit) – 4:18
Way Out of Here (album version) – 7:37

Personnel (song)
Steven Wilson – vocals, guitar
Richard Barbieri – keyboards
Colin Edwin – bass
Gavin Harrison – drums
Robert Fripp – soundscapes

Music video
An edited version of the music video for the song was posted on the band's myspace. It was directed by long-time collaborator, artist Lasse Hoile. The full version can be seen at the band's live show.
The video was shot in Aarhus, Silkeborg, and Vrads, Denmark.

The video is dedicated to Arielle Daniel, a girl who was killed by a train on 12 November 2005, at the age of seventeen, together with a friend of hers, Heather Bates, who was fourteen years old. Arielle was a big Porcupine Tree fan who founded the band's MySpace Group. According to news reports, the girls stepped into the path of the train together in an apparent suicide attempt. Both were from Oak Creek, Wisconsin. During a show at Milwaukee, Wisconsin, on 2 June 2007, her family were present among the audience, so Steven Wilson paid tribute to them, saying "This is for Arielle" just before the band played "Blackest Eyes" which was her favourite song. That night, "Way Out of Here" was performed without showing the video on the screen.

Personnel (video)
Lasse Hoile – director.

References

2007 songs
Porcupine Tree songs
Songs written by Steven Wilson
Songs written by Richard Barbieri
Songs written by Colin Edwin
Songs written by Gavin Harrison